Alexander Mackenzie most commonly refers to:
Alexander Mackenzie (explorer) (1764–1820), Scottish explorer and commercial partner of the North West Company
Alexander Mackenzie (politician) (1822–1892), second prime minister of Canada

Alexander Mackenzie or MacKenzie may also refer to:

Alexander Mackenzie of Kintail (died after 1471), Scottish clan chief
Alexander Muir Mackenzie (1764–1835), Scottish advocate and landowner
Alexander Slidell Mackenzie (1803–1848), US Navy officer involved in the "Somers Affair"
Alexander Mackenzie (historian) (1838–1898), Scottish historian
Alexander Slidell MacKenzie (1842–1867), US Navy officer, son of Alexander Slidell Mackenzie
Alexander Mackenzie (civil servant) (1842–1902), British colonial official in Burma
Alexander Mackenzie (engineer) (1844–1921), US Army Chief of Engineers
Alexander Mackenzie (composer) (1847–1935), Scottish violinist, conductor, composer and head of the Royal Academy of Music in London
Alexander Marshall Mackenzie (1848–1933), Scottish architect
Alick Mackenzie or Alexander Cecil Knox Mackenzie (1870–1947), Australian cricketer
Alexander MacKenzie (priest) (1876–1969), Provost of St Andrew's Cathedral, Inverness
Alexander George Robertson Mackenzie (1879–1963), Scottish architect and son of Alexander Marshall Mackenzie
Alex Mackenzie (1885–1965), Scottish character actor
Alexander Mackenzie (artist) (1923–2002), St Ives school artist
Alexander Mackenzie (Australian politician) (born 1941)
Alexander MacKenzie (rugby union) (born 1956), Scottish rugby player

See also
Alexander McKenzie (disambiguation)
Alister MacKenzie (1870–1934), British golf course architect
Sandy MacKenzie (born 1973), ice hockey player